The CONIFA South America Football Cup, also referred to as CONIFA Copa América, is an international football tournament organized by CONIFA, an umbrella association for states, minorities, stateless peoples and regions unaffiliated with FIFA.

History

Chile 2022 

On 24 January 2022, CONIFA announced that the first edition of the CONIFA South America Football Cup would take place in Linares, Chile and feature 4 teams (Aymara, Mapuche, Maule Sur and São Paulo FAD). São Paulo FAD however was unable to arrive in time for the dispute due to excessive ice on the roads in southern Chile, and the tournament has been changed to a single round robin format. Maule Sur won the first edition of the tournament.

Results

Notes

Appearances
 Legend
  — Champions
  — Runners-up
  — Third place
  — Fourth place
 GS — Group Stage
 q — Qualified for upcoming tournament
  — Qualified but withdrew
  — Did not qualify
  — Did not enter / Withdrew / Banned / Entry not accepted by CONIFA
  — Hosts

For each tournament, the number of teams in each finals tournament (in brackets) are shown.

References

 
Confederation of Independent Football Associations
Non-FIFA football competitions